Olav Hagesæther (1909–1999) was a Norwegian theologian, priest, and Bishop of the Diocese of Stavanger.  His son, Ole Hagesæther, was also a Norwegian bishop in the Diocese of Bjørgvin.

Biography
Olav Hagesæther was born on 25 August 1909 in Bergen, Norway to Andreas and Karen Hagesæther.  He went to the MF Norwegian School of Theology from 1928 until his graduation in 1932.  He received a cand.theol. degree.  He was hired as a teacher at the Nordhordland Bible school run by Det norske lutherske Indremisjonsselskap missionary organization during the 1930s.  In 1939, he was hired as the assistant pastor for Haus Church in Haus, Norway.  From 1945 to 1958, he was the parish priest for Rjukan Church.  In 1958, he was hired as an assistant pastor at the Johannes Church in Bergen.  In 1964, he was promoted to parish priest for the same church.  In 1968, he was appointed to the post of Bishop of the Diocese of Stavanger, based at the Stavanger Cathedral.  He held this job until his retirement in 1976.  He died on 7 March 1999 in Stavanger after a long illness.

References

1909 births
1999 deaths
Bishops of Stavanger
20th-century Lutheran bishops